REA or Rea may refer to:

Places
 Rea, Lombardy, in Italy
 Rea, Missouri, United States
 River Rea, a river in Birmingham, England
 River Rea, Shropshire, a river in Shropshire, England
 Rea, Hungarian name of Reea village in Totești Commune, Hunedoara County, Romania

Acronyms
 Railway Express Agency (1918–1975), a defunct American package delivery service
 Ralph Engelstad Arena, ice hockey venue at the University of North Dakota in Grand Forks, North Dakota
 Reactive arthritis, inflammatory arthritis that develops in response to an infection in another part of the body
 Reggio Emilia approach, an educational philosophy
 Religious Education Association, American scholarly organization
 Renewable Energy Association, British trade association
 Research & Education Association, American publisher of test preparation materials and study guides
 Resident Evil: Afterlife (2010), an American horror film
 Resident Evil: Apocalypse (2004), am American horror film
 Resources, Events, Agents, a theoretical model for computerized accounting
 Rules Enabling Act (1934), US law empowering Federal courts to create "Rules of Civil Procedure"
 Rural Electrification Administration (1932–1994), former name of the  Rural Utilities Service, a US government agency
 Restrictive Early Action, a type of early action in American college admissions
 Rapid Equilibrium Assumption, a method for solving Stiff ODEs

Other
 Rea (name), including a list of people and characters with the name
 Rea (album)
 Mens rea (Latin for "guilty mind"), a legal term
 Rea Award for the Short Story, an annual American and Canadian literary award
 Rhea (bird), sometimes misspelled "rea"
 Rea Magnet Wire, manufacturer of a broad range of magnet wire and other specialty wire
 REA Group, the parent company of property website realestate.com.au